Rebecca Saire (born 16 April 1963) is a British actress and writer who gained early attention when, at the age of fourteen, she played Juliet for the BBC Television Shakespeare series.

Stage 
 Sybil in Private Lives (National Theatre)
 Eliante in The Misanthrope (Piccadilly Theatre)
 Mabel in An Ideal Husband (Gielgud Theatre)
 Gwendolen in Travesties (RSC and Savoy Theatre)
 Diana in All's Well That Ends Well (RSC)
 Audrey Walsingham in The School of Night (RSC)
 Rachel in A Jovial Crew (RSC)
 She was "a beautiful and truly tragic Ophelia" (Time Out) to Mark Rylance's Hamlet at the RSC in 1989
 Princess Mary in Crown Matrimonial (Yvonne Arnaud Theatre/Tour)

Filmography

Television 
Romeo and Juliet (1978)
Quatermass (1979, TV)
Love in a Cold Climate (TV serial, 1980), as Victoria
 A.D. (1985), TV film
Vanity Fair (1987, TV)
Jeeves and Wooster (1991, TV)
 Dr. Jenkins in My Dad's the PM
 Aline Hemmingway in Jeeves and Wooster
 Theresa Nolan in A Taste for Death
 Shona, the high-flying executive wife of DC Duncan Lennox in the long running ITV Drama The Bill
 She also made guest appearances in A Bit of Fry and Laurie
 Midsomer Murders Season 7, Episode 3 (2004)
 Lady Alexandra Curzon in episode 6, season 2 ("Vergangenheit") of The Crown (2017)
 Mrs. Radowicz in Episode 4 Season 5, Episode 2 Series 7 of Endeavour (2019)
Killing Eve (2020, BBC TV), as Bertha Kruger, Series 3, Episode 4
 Miriam Heartley-Reade in Season 7, Episode 3 - The Fisher King of Midsomer Murders
 Jonquil Heathcote in Doctors (2022)

Films

The Shooting Party (1985)

Radio 
 Caroline of Brunswick, Princess of Wales, in "The People's Princess",
 Philippa in "The Experiences of an Irish RM", based on The Irish R.M. novels,
 Sue in "The Small Back Room", based on the novel of that title,
 Joan Greenwood in "Kind Hearts", about the classic comedy film Kind Hearts and Coronets

Writing 
Saire has written three plays for BBC Radio 4, all produced by Eoin O'Callaghan:
 Standing on Tiptoe
 The Detox
 Clapham Junction (Radio Times - Pick of the Week)

References

External links

1963 births
Living people
Actresses from London
English child actresses
English stage actresses
English television actresses
English radio actresses
People educated at Watford Grammar School for Girls